María Elena Velasco Fragoso (17 December 1940 – 1 May 2015) was a Mexican actress, comedian, singer-songwriter and dancer. She is best known for creating and portraying La India María, a comical character based on indigenous Mexican women.

Early life
Velasco was born in Puebla, to Tomás Velasco Saavedra, a railway mechanic, and María Elena Fragoso Peón. She had three siblings, Gloria, Tomás and Susana.

After the death of Tomás Velasco, the family moved to Mexico City, where she worked as a dancer at the Teatro Tívoli. Later, she became one of the showgirls of the Teatro Blanquita, where she also participated in sketches starring comedians such as José "El Ojón" Jasso and Óscar Ortiz de Pinedo, among others.

Career
In 1962, her popularity at the Teatro Blanquita attracted the attention of producer Miguel Morayta, who cast her in her first film role in the drama Los derechos de los hijos (1963), starring Elvira Quintana and Carlos Agostí. Juan Bustillo Oro gave her the small part of Petra, a maid, in México de mis recuerdos (1963). In 1964, she began to include comedic material to her appearances in sketches and, in the meantime, played servants in television programs. She soon developed a comedy character named Elena María, a rural Mexican woman. Her breakthrough came when director Fernando Cortés recommended her to portray an indigenous woman named "María" in one of Mantequilla's sketches. The character was dressed in traditional garb consisting of traditionally braided and ribboned hair and colorful native-type blouses and skirts. In an effort to make her portrayal more authentic, she observed the gestures and mannerisms of indigenous women; her own mother made dresses for the character. She later appeared in the western El bastardo (1968), where she was credited for the first time as "María Elena Velasco 'La India María'".

In 1969, Velasco appeared as La India María in a comic segment of the weekly program Siempre en domingo, hosted by Raúl Velasco (who is unrelated to María Elena). The segment quickly became a hit and she starred in other successful television programs. Her first La India María film, Tonta, tonta, pero no tanto (1972), was directed by Fernando Cortés; in total, Cortés directed eight La India María films until his death in 1979. The enormous success of the film spawned a series of low-budget comedies that became a mainstay in Mexican movie theaters. Velasco won a Silver Goddess Award for Best Comedic Performance for ¡El que no corre... vuela! (1982). She made her directorial debut in El coyote emplumado (1983). She also starred the television series Ay María, qué puntería (1998).

Personal life
In the early 1960s, Velasco met Russian-born Mexican film actor and choreographer Julián de Meriche (born Vladimir Lipkies Chazan) at the Teatro Blanquita. They married and had two children, producer-director Iván Lipkies and actress, screenwriter and producer Ivette Eugenia Lipkies, also known as Goretti Lipkies. She later said: "My husband was worth gold, I will not lie and say he was the perfect man, but he was the love of my life." She also had a daughter with Raul Velasco named Marina Velasco who was given up and kept a secret, 

In 2020 a new scandal surfaced after two women, Mirna Velasco and Denisse Guerrero, singer of the Mexican pop band Belanova, affirmed to be daughters of Velasco with Mexican host Raúl Velasco.

Death
Her death was announced over Twitter by the Instituto Mexicano de Cinematografía on 1 May 2015; the cause of death was not made public, but it was known that she had been suffering from stomach cancer.

Performances

Film

Television

Stage

Discography
 La mejor cantante de todas las grabadoras (1971)
 De chile, de dulce y de manteca (1982)

See also 
List of Mexicans
Lucila Mariscal - who played "Lencha, la india"

References

Further reading

External links

1940 births
2015 deaths
20th-century Mexican actresses
21st-century Mexican actresses
Actresses from Puebla
Best Adapted Screenplay Ariel Award winners
Deaths from stomach cancer
Deaths from cancer in Mexico
Golden Age of Mexican cinema
Mexican film actresses
Mexican screenwriters
Mexican women singer-songwriters
Mexican singer-songwriters
Mexican stage actresses
Mexican television actresses
Mexican women comedians
Mexican women film directors
Mexican women film producers
Musart Records artists
People from Puebla (city)
Mexican people of Basque descent
Mexican people of Spanish descent
Mexican people of Italian descent
Mexican people of indigenous peoples descent